Annasaheb Awate Arts, Commerce & Hutatma Babu Genu Science College, is an undergraduate and postgraduate, coeducational college situated in Mancher, Pune district, Maharashtra. It was established in the year 1966. The college is affiliated with Pune University. This college offers different courses in arts, science and commerce.

Accreditation
The college is  recognized by the University Grants Commission (UGC).

Eminent personalities
 The Marathi poet, dramatist, actor, director and producer Santosh Pawar has served as faculty member at this college.

References

External links

Universities and colleges in Pune
Educational institutions established in 1966
1966 establishments in Maharashtra